Ludwig Rübekeil (born 1958) is a German philologist who is Professor of Germanic philology at the University of Zurich.

Biography
Ludwig Rübekeil enrolled at the Pädagogische Hochschule Weingarten in 1977, from which he graduated with a degree in German, Art and Education in 1981. From 1981 he studied Germanic philology, Indo-European studies and Scandinavian studies at the University of Freiburg, from which he earned his PhD in 1990. From 1992 to 1994, he taught German at the University of Bamberg under Rolf Bergmann. In 1995 Rübekeil became a lecturer on Germanic philology at the University of Zurich, where he has since become a professor.

Selected works
 Suebica. Völkernamen und Ethnos, 1992
 Diachrone Studien zur Kontaktzone zwischen Kelten und Germanen, 2002

References

Bibliography
Kürschners Deutscher Gelehrten-Kalender 2015. Bio-bibliographisches Verzeichnis deutschsprachiger Wissenschaftler der Gegenwart. 27. Auflage. de Gruyter, Berlin u. a. 2014,  (Kürschner-Online kostenpflichtig at De Gruyter Online).

External links
 Ludwig Rübekeil at the website of the University of Zurich 
 Ludwig Rübekeil at Academia.edu

1958 births
German philologists
Germanic studies scholars
Linguists of Germanic languages
Living people
University of Freiburg alumni
Academic staff of the University of Bamberg
Academic staff of the University of Zurich